Marigje Arriens or Marichgen Ariaens (c. 1520 – 18 December 1591) was an alleged Dutch witch, long thought to be the last to be executed for sorcery in the Dutch Republic.

Biography
Marigje Arriens was born c. 1520, in Poederoijen.

Arriens was active in medicine. There are two theories of why Arriens got accused to be a witch. One theory is that she was accused by an unsatisfied patient. The second theory is that a young boy saw Arriens practice witchcraft. The tale goes that she touched the boys hair and that as a result his hair shrunk. She was judged guilty of sorcery and sentenced to be strangled after which her body was burned to ashes. 

She was long thought to be among the last people executed for sorcery in the Dutch Republic, a country where the witch hunt ended earlier than in many other European countries. One of the reasons for this misconception was that the year of her death had been believed to be 1597 instead of 1591. Even so, there were people in the republic executed for sorcery after 1597; as of 2014, the last known such person was Anna Muggen, who was put to death in the same fashion in Gorinchem in 1608. However, she was nonetheless among the last people executed for sorcery in the Dutch Republic, were executions for this crime did end around this time. Witch trials and burnings lasted longer in the Spanish Netherlands, including the 1613 Roermond witch trial, where 64 people were burnt at the stake.

She died 18 December 1591, in Schoonhoven.

Legacy
The song "Born for Burning", by the Swedish black metal band Bathory, was dedicated to Arriens.

See also 
 Mechteld ten Ham

References

1520 births
1591 deaths
16th-century Dutch women
Executed Dutch women
People executed for witchcraft
People executed by the Dutch Republic
People from Zaltbommel
Cunning folk
Witch trials in the Netherlands